The Schwedentrunk (Swedish drink) is a method of torture and execution in which the victim is forced to swallow large amounts of foul liquid, such as excrement. The name was invented by German victims of Swedish troops during the Thirty Years' War. This method of torture was administered by other international troops, mercenaries, and marauders, and especially by civilians following the Swedish baggage train, who received no pay. It was used to force peasants or town citizens to hand over hidden money, food, animals, etc., or to extort sex from women.

The memory of the Schwedentrunk was immortalized in one of the first widely read German books, the satirical Der abenteuerliche Simplicissimus published by Hans Jakob Christoffel von Grimmelshausen in 1668.

Mechanism

Its English translation is:

Use of the Schwedentrunk is recorded in the histories of towns throughout Southern Germany. Though specific circumstances differed, in every case a restrained and gagged victim was forced to swallow (by means of a funnel) a large amount of unappetizing, sometimes boiling liquid. Substances such as urine, excrement, liquid manure, and sullage were used for this purpose.

Apart from disgust, illness, and the possibility of bacterial infection, the Schwedentrunk inflicted intense gastric pain. Because liquids are incompressible, the victim's stomach and bowels must expand to painful proportions to accommodate the copious quantities of fluid. The torturers then squeezed the distended belly with wooden boards, trampled the victim underfoot or beat them with sticks. Sometimes a victim was stabbed with spears in the stomach.

See also 
 Water cure
 Waterboarding

References

External links 
  Suffering of the population

Modern instruments of torture
European instruments of torture
Swedish drink
Water torture